Parker is an English language unisex given name of Old English origin, meaning "park keeper", hence also an Old English occupational surname.  Parker was more common in the 19th century as a personal name than it is now. The name has variants.

People with the given name include:
Parker Burrell (1937-2010), Canadian politician
 Parker Cannon, lead singer of The Story So Far
Parker Cleaveland (1780–1858), American geologist and mineralogist
Parker Dunshee (born 1995), American professional baseball player
Parker Fennelly (1891–1988), American actor
Parker Gispert (born 1982), American, lead singer of The Whigs
Parker Griffith (born 1942), American politician
Parker Hall (1916–2005), American football player
Parker Hesse (born 1995), American football player
Parker Jacobs (born 1975), American artist, actor and musician
Parker Johnstone (born 1961), American racecar driver 
Parker MacDonald (1933–2017), Canadian professional ice hockey player
Parker Lee McDonald (1924–2017), American judge
Parker McKenzie (1897–1999), American linguist, oldest living Kiowa Native American
Parker McLachlin (born 1979), American professional golfer
Parker Mitchell, Canadian co-founder of Engineers Without Borders
Parker J. Palmer (born 1939),  American author, educator, and activist
Parker Posey (born 1968), American actress 
Parker Stevenson (born 1952), American actor

Fictional characters:

Parker Lewis, television show character, portrayed by Corin Nemec

See also
Parker (surname)

References

English unisex given names
English-language unisex given names